Since 1840, when the Penny Black featured a profile of Queen Victoria, it has been a tradition worldwide for nations to honor individuals on their postage stamps. Typical choices include monarchs, important figures of history, politicians, cultural leaders, and (more recently) celebrities.

The usual practice is for the stamp to feature a portrait of the person, either full-length or head alone. In a few cases, the person being honored is represented by an image relating to the person's life. However, the depiction of a work of art (such as for a Christmas stamp) is not considered to be honoring the artist.

The list that follows is an index to the lists of people for individual countries. In some cases, several short lists from related countries are merged into a single list, while entries without links indicate entities that never had any people on their stamps. The parenthesized dates following each entry indicates the first and last dates of stamp issuance; within each country's list, the date or dates indicates the year of the person's appearance on a stamp.



C 

Canada (1851–)
Canadian provinces (1850–1947)
Central African Republic (1959–)
Chile (1853–)
People's Republic of China (1949–)
Republic of China (1950–)
Colombia (1859–)
Costa Rica (1863–)
Croatia (1941–1945, 1991–)
Cuba (1855–)

D 

Denmark (1851–)
Djibouti (1977–)

F 

Faroe Islands (1919–)

G 

German Democratic Republic (1949–1990)

H 

 Hawaii (1851–1899)
Hong Kong (1862–1999)
Hungary (1871–)

I 

Iceland (1873–)
India (1854–)
Ireland (1922–)

J 

Japan (1871–)

L 

Latvia (1918–1940, 1991–)

M 

Malta (1860–)
Mexico (1856–)

N 

Netherlands (1852–)
Netherlands New Guinea (1950–1962)
New Zealand (1855–)
Nigeria (1914–)
Norway (1855–)

P 

Pakistan (1947–)
Peru (1857–)
Portugal (1853–)

R 

Russia (1857–1923, 1992–)

S 

Samoa (1877–)
San Marino (1877–)
Sri Lanka (1972–)
Sudan (1897–)

U 

United Kingdom (1840–)
United States (1847–)

See also
 Topical stamp collecting

References 

 
Postage stamps by country
Postage stamps